Eastlands may refer to:

 Eastlands, Manchester, an area of east Manchester, England
 The City of Manchester Stadium, often shortened to Eastlands, Manchester
 Eastlands area, Nairobi lying to the south-east of Nairobi province
 Eastlands Shopping Centre, a shopping center in Hobart

See also
 Eastland (disambiguation)